On 7 February 1981, a Tupolev Tu-104A passenger jet crashed during take off from Pushkin Airport near Leningrad (today's Saint Petersburg), Russia, resulting in the death of all 50 people on board, including 28 high-ranking Soviet military personnel. The official investigation concluded that the aircraft was improperly loaded.

Accident
At 18:00 local time, the Tu-104A lined up on runway 21 and commenced its take-off run during snowing weather conditions. The aircraft continued to roll right until it struck the ground  from the departure end of the runway, crashing nearly inverted and bursting into flames, killing 49 of the 50 people on board. One person in the cockpit was ejected from the nose of the aircraft, and was found alive in the snow not far from the crash site, but died on the way to a hospital.

Aircraft
The Tupolev Tu-104A involved was serial number 76600402 and registered as СССР-42332 to the Soviet Navy. The construction of the airliner was completed on 26 November 1957.

Investigation
The investigation of the accident revealed that the crew allowed the aircraft to be improperly loaded. Evidence was uncovered that led investigators to believe that some military officers did not comply with seating assignments given by the crew and that these officers pressured the crew to make the flight in an unsafely loaded aircraft. Another factor reported by witnesses was that large rolls of printing paper were loaded on board, and these are believed to have rolled rearward during acceleration on take-off, causing the center of gravity to shift aft of acceptable limits, thereby reducing the stability of the aircraft in pitch, making lowering the nose impossible for the crew.

Casualties

The Tupolev Tu-104A was carrying many of the Pacific Fleet's senior officers from Leningrad, where they had been attending meetings with the naval command, to Vladivostok, via Khabarovsk. Among the dead were 16 admirals and generals, including the commander of the Pacific Fleet, Admiral Emil Spiridonov, and his wife. They were both interred with most of the other victims of the crash in the Serafimovskoe Cemetery in Leningrad, where a memorial to the dead was erected on the orders of the Navy's commander-in-chief, Sergey Gorshkov. A memorial service is held annually on 7 February at the St. Nicholas Naval Cathedral in St Petersburg, and on the 20th anniversary of the crash, the line: "Those who died in the line of duty on 7 February 1981", and an Orthodox cross were added to the memorial stele commemorating the Pacific Navy sailors.

See also
 1972 Puerto Rico DC-7 crash

References

Aviation accidents and incidents in 1981
Accidents and incidents involving the Tupolev Tu-104
Aviation accidents and incidents in the Soviet Union
1981 in the Soviet Union
Soviet Navy

External links
YouTube summary of accident